ISO 3166-2:HK is the entry for Hong Kong in ISO 3166-2, part of the ISO 3166 standard published by the International Organization for Standardization (ISO), which defines codes for the names of the principal subdivisions (e.g., provinces or states) of all countries coded in ISO 3166-1.

Currently no ISO 3166-2 codes are defined in the entry for Hong Kong.

Hong Kong, a special administrative region of China, is officially assigned the ISO 3166-1 alpha-2 code . Moreover, it is also assigned the ISO 3166-2 code  under the entry for China.

See also
 Subdivisions of Hong Kong

External links
 ISO Online Browsing Platform: HK
 Districts of Hong Kong, Statoids.com

2:HK
Geography of Hong Kong